Sarotesius is a monotypic genus of East African huntsman spiders containing the single species, Sarotesius melanognathus. It was first described by Reginald Innes Pocock in 1898, and is found in Africa.

See also
 List of Sparassidae species

References

Monotypic Araneomorphae genera
Sparassidae
Spiders of Africa
Taxa named by R. I. Pocock